Robert Otto Wittke Jr. (born September 23, 1957) is an accountant and Republican politician.  He is a member of the Wisconsin State Assembly for the 62nd district, representing the northern half of Racine County.

Biography
Born in Racine, Wisconsin, to Robert Wittke Sr. and Margaret Wittke née Jankowski, Wittke graduated from William Horlick High School in 1975 and received a B.A. in accounting from the University of Wisconsin–Eau Claire in 1980.  He worked as a tax accountant for Modine Manufacturing in Racine from 1980 to 1986, then at Snap-on Inc. in Kenosha from 1988 to 1994.  He then worked for Deloitte in their tax consultancy from 1994 to 2002.  Since 2012, he has been employed by CORPTAX, a tax software as a service company based in Deerfield, Illinois.

Wittke resides in Wind Point, Wisconsin, he is married and has four children.

Political career
Wittke first ran for Racine Unified School Board in 2013, placing fourth in a top-three at-large election.

In 2015, the Wisconsin Legislature passed a law requiring Racine Unified School Board seats to be assigned to geographic districts, rather than elected at-large. Wittke ran for the newly drawn ninth district in the 2016 school board elections. He was elected in April 2016, defeating retiree Kurt Squire. A year later, in April 2017, Wittke was elected School Board President.

In April 2018, Tom Weatherston announced that he would not seek re-election to a fourth term representing the 62nd district in the Wisconsin State Assembly. Wittke announced his candidacy for the seat the next day. He defeated John Leiber in the Republican Primary, and went on to defeat former State Senator John Lehman in the 2018 general election.

Wittke announced that he would not seek re-election to the Racine School Board in 2019.

Electoral history

Racine School Board (2013, 2016)

| colspan="6" style="text-align:center;background-color: #e9e9e9;"| General Election, April 2, 2013 

| colspan="6" style="text-align:center;background-color: #e9e9e9;"| General Election, April 5, 2016

Wisconsin Assembly (2018–present)

| colspan="6" style="text-align:center;background-color: #e9e9e9;"| Republican Primary, August 14, 2018

| colspan="6" style="text-align:center;background-color: #e9e9e9;"| General Election, November 6, 2018

| colspan="6" style="text-align:center;background-color: #e9e9e9;"| General Election, November 3, 2020

| colspan="6" style="text-align:center;background-color: #e9e9e9;"| General Election, November 7, 2022 (unofficial results)

References

1957 births
Living people
Businesspeople from Racine, Wisconsin
Politicians from Racine, Wisconsin
University of Wisconsin–Eau Claire alumni
School board members in Wisconsin
Republican Party members of the Wisconsin State Assembly
21st-century American politicians
William Horlick High School alumni